Eric Jeffrey Topol (born 26 June 1954) is an American cardiologist, scientist, and author. He is the founder and director of the Scripps Research Translational Institute, a professor of Molecular Medicine at The Scripps Research Institute, and a senior consultant at the Division of Cardiovascular Diseases at Scripps Clinic in La Jolla, California. He is editor-in-chief of Medscape and theheart.org. He has published three bestseller books on the future of medicine: The Creative Destruction of Medicine (2010), The Patient Will See You Now (2015), and Deep Medicine: How Artificial Intelligence Can Make Healthcare Human Again (2019). He was also commissioned by the UK 2018–2019 to lead planning for the National Health Service's future workforce, integrating genomics, digital medicine, and artificial intelligence.

In 2016, Topol was awarded a US$207 million grant from the National Institutes of Health to lead a significant part of the Precision Medicine Initiative (All of Us Research Program), a one million American prospective research program. This is in addition to his role as principal investigator for a $35M grant from the National Institutes of Health to promote innovation in medicine and the education and career training of future medical researchers.

Research 
As a researcher, Topol has published over 1,200 peer-reviewed articles, with more than 310,000 citations, h-index 235, elected to the National Academy of Medicine, and is one of the top 10 most cited researchers in medicine. His principal scientific focus has been on the genomic and digital tools, with the use of artificial intelligence analytics, to individualize medicine. He also pioneered the development of many medications that are routinely used in medical practice including t-PA, Plavix, Angiomax, and ReoPro. He has led clinical trials in over 40 countries involving over 200,000 patients (first in series – GUSTO trials). He has edited over 30 books, including the Textbook of Interventional Cardiology (8th ed - Elsevier, 2020), and the Textbook of Cardiovascular Medicine (3rd ed - Lippincott Williams & Wilkins).

Education and career 
Topol completed medical school at the University of Rochester (MD with Honor), his residency in internal medicine at the University of California, San Francisco, and his fellowship in cardiovascular medicine at Johns Hopkins University.

Topol was a tenured professor at the University of Michigan for 6 years. At age 36, Topol was named chairman of the Department of Cardiovascular Medicine at the Cleveland Clinic, where he is widely credited for leading its already long outstanding cardiovascular program to being ranked #1 by U.S. News & World Report for more than a decade during his 13 years at the helm. In 2002 he founded the Cleveland Clinic Lerner College of Medicine, the first new medical school in the US in 20 years, with its first class in 2004, and served as its provost and chief academic officer of the Cleveland Clinic. In 2003 he became a professor of genetics at Case Western Reserve University, while maintaining his primary appointment at Cleveland Clinic.

Topol departed from the Cleveland Clinic Lerner College of Medicine in 2006 following the removal of the chief academic officer position, and continued at Case Western Reserve University. He was then recruited by Scripps Health and The Scripps Research Institute in late 2006 to create a new institute, now called Scripps Research Translational, dedicated to individualized medicine. In 2009, Topol worked with Gary and Mary West to create the West Wireless Health Institute, now called West Health Institute, to foster the use of digital tools in medical research and practice.

Genetics and genomics
At the University of Virginia, Topol authored his baccalaureate thesis in 1975 entitled “Prospects for Genetic Therapy in Man” and received a Bachelor of Arts degree With Highest Distinction. During his fellowship at Johns Hopkins, he was involved with the first patient who was administered tissue plasminogen activator (t-PA) in 1984, a genetically engineered protein. In 1996, he started the first dedicated cardiovascular gene bank while at Cleveland Clinic. This effort led to many discoveries in the genetics of cardiovascular disease, including the identification of key genes associated with heart attacks. Both thrombospondin variants and the MEF2A deletion reports were recognized as top 10 advances by the American Heart Association in 2000 and 2004. He was the principal investigator of the National Institutes of Health's Specialized Centers of Clinically Oriented Research grant on the genomics of heart attack with a $17M award in 2005. His work in genetics has been recognized by the American College of Cardiology with the Simon Dack Award and Lecture in 2005 and by the European Society of Cardiology by the Andreas Gruentzig Award and Lecture in 2004.

Wireless medicine 
Topol has been involved with wireless medicine since its inception. He was the first physician to serve on CardioNet's Medical Advisory Board in 1999, the first dedicated wireless medicine company that performs real-time remote, continuous electrocardiogram rhythm monitoring. In 2007 he joined the Board of Sotera Wireless that has developed the first continuous non-invasive blood pressure monitoring device, which also captures all vital signs. In 2008 he forged a new educational program with Qualcomm and Scripps Health to train physicians in wireless medicine, a 2-year clinician scholar program: STSI Wireless Health Scholar. At the 2009 International Wireless CTIA meeting, he gave the keynote address on wireless health, the first time that topic was the subject of a CTIA plenary session.  Also in 2009, he served as co-founder with Gary and Mary West to form the West Wireless Health Institute. He is the vice-chairman of the institute and its chief innovation officer. In 2009 he also presented at TEDMED the rapid progress being made in this field. In addition, in early 2010 Topol gave a wireless medicine presentation at the Consumer Electronic Show. He led the first trial with the GE Vscan device GE Reports, a pocket high resolution, mobile ultrasound imaging device, introduced in the US in 2010 "The Doctor Will “e” You Now" and is currently leading clinical trials of heart rhythm and heart failure monitoring wireless devices.

NHS
Topol was commissioned by Jeremy Hunt in 2018 to carry out a review of how the NHS workforce will need to change “to deliver a digital future”.  His report suggested that within ten years most patients would be managing their own long-term conditions with wearable devices and sensors, and that that would be much more effective than occasional appointments with a doctor.  Patients would not be monitored in hospitals but at home. This rise in regular monitoring would necessitate new workflows and frameworks in digital healthcare. More nursing and physician associates would be required, enabling doctors to focus on the most difficult cases.  The report also recommended specific digital training for NHS staff and physicians. His work on "high-performance medicine" that builds on this report was also published in Nature.

Vioxx 
Topol served as chairman of cardiovascular medicine at Cleveland Clinic from 1991 to 2005. He was one of the first researchers to question the cardiovascular safety of rofecoxib (Vioxx), culminating in that drug's withdrawal from the market. Topol's advocacy on the subject led to what The New York Times described as an "unusually public dispute" with the Cleveland Clinic's leadership over ties between the academic institution and the pharmaceutical industry, ultimately leading to Topol's departure after his administrative position as head of their academic program was abolished.

Topol gained prominence as the first physician researcher to raise questions about the safety of rofecoxib (Vioxx) and was highly critical of Merck's handling of its safety issues. In a 2004 editorial in The New York Times, he wrote that "Merck finally had to acknowledge the truth [about the drug's cardiovascular risks], but only by accident." Topol also authored an editorial in the New England Journal of Medicine, arguing that "neither Merck nor the FDA fulfilled its responsibilities to the public" and encouraging a "full congressional review" of the situation.

In 2004, Bethany McLean, writing in Fortune, questioned Topol's own potential financial conflicts of interest. She reported that Topol served as a scientific advisor to a hedge fund which profited substantially by short selling Merck stock, which plummeted due to the concerns about Vioxx which Topol had publicized. Topol denied giving the hedge fund advance information, and subsequently severed his ties to industry, donating all such income directly to charity. In a 2005 Journal of the American Medical Association commentary, Topol pointed to these allegations as an example of the complications that physicians can experience when associating with the investment industry, at the same time reiterating that "no true conflict of interest existed in this case."

In November 2005, Topol was subpoenaed in a class action lawsuit against Merck. He testified that Vioxx posed an "extraordinary risk", and that Raymond Gilmartin, former chief executive officer of Merck, had contacted the head of the Cleveland Clinic board to complain about Topol's work on Vioxx. Two days afterward, Topol was informed that the position as chief academic officer at the Cleveland Clinic had been abolished, and he was removed as provost of the Cleveland Clinic Lerner College of Medicine, which he had founded. The clinic described the timing as coincidental. The New York Times described Topol's demotion as part of an "unusually public dispute" between Topol and the Cleveland Clinic's chief executive, Delos Cosgrove, and stated that Topol's criticism of Merck had focused scrutiny and criticism on the clinic's deep and longstanding ties to the pharmaceutical and medical-device industries.

COVID-19

In August 2020, Topol published an open letter in Medscape to FDA Commissioner Stephen Hahn, criticizing his Emergency Use Authorizations of hydroxychloroquine, convalescent plasma, and remdesivir for COVID-19. Topol wrote, "These repeated breaches demonstrate your willingness to ignore the lack of scientific evidence, and to be complicit with the Trump Administration's politicization of America's healthcare institutions." Hahn had stated that he was prepared to authorize a vaccine before Phase 3 trials were completed, but Topol said that this would not allow the FDA to establish safety and efficacy, would jeopardize the vaccine program, and would betray the public trust. He called on Hahn to revise his statement or resign.

After conversations with Topol, Hahn retracted some of those claims. In September 2020, Hahn tightened up the rules for approving a vaccine, requiring a longer follow-up period, leading to criticism from Trump. Trump attacked Hahn in a tweet, saying that the rules should be loosened. Some argue that this delayed the approval of the Pfizer vaccine by around a month, with the Phase 3 trial endpoints being met on November 8, 2020, 5 days after the presidential election.

Honors 
Topol was selected as one of the 12 “Rock Stars of Science” by GQ and the Geoffrey Beene Foundation in 2009. He was elected to the American Society for Clinical Investigation, the Association of American Physicians, and the Johns Hopkins Society of Scholars. In 2004, he was elected to the Institute of Medicine of the National Academy of Sciences. He was named Doctor of the Decade by the Institute for Scientific Information for being one of the top 10 most cited medical researchers. In 2011, Topol received the Hutchinson Medal from the University of Rochester in addition to giving the commencement speech for the School of Medicine and Dentistry. In 2012, Modern Healthcare ranked Topol as the most influential physician executive in the United States.

Personal life 
He is married to Susan Merriman Topol with whom he has two children.

Bibliography 
 Topol, Eric. The Patient Will See You Now: The Future of Medicine Is in Your Hands. New York: Basic Books, 2015 —  
 Topol, Eric. The Creative Destruction of Medicine: How the Digital Revolution Will Create Better Health Care. New York: Basic Books, 2012 — 
 Topol, Eric J., and Paul S. Teirstein. 1st edition, 1989; Textbook of Interventional Cardiology, 7th edition. Philadelphia, PA: Elsevier, 2015 — ; 8th edition, 2019 — 
 Topol, Eric J. Deep Medicine, 2019 —

See also 
 Exome sequencing
 Personal genomics
 Whole genome sequencing

References

Further reading
+

External links

Topol's profile at Scripps Translational Science Institute
Topol's profile at Scripps Health
Topol's talk at TEDMED 2009 conference
 
 Video (08:51) Topol's interview by Nancy Snyderman for the television program Rock Center.

Living people
1954 births
Scripps Research faculty
American cardiologists
American geneticists
University of Virginia alumni
Johns Hopkins School of Medicine alumni
University of Michigan faculty
Cleveland Clinic people
Members of the National Academy of Medicine